The Ox Bow Inn and Saloon is an historic hotel in Payson, Arizona. The log inn was built as the Payson Hotel by William and Estlee Wade next to their restaurant, the Busy Bee. The rustic inn borrowed design elements from the Old Faithful Inn, with which Willie Wade was familiar from time spent in Yellowstone National Park. In 1945 the business was taken over and expanded by Jimmy Cox, who renamed the hotel the Ox Bow Inn.

References

External links

 Oxbow Inn and Saloon

Hotel buildings on the National Register of Historic Places in Arizona
Buildings and structures in Gila County, Arizona
Rustic architecture in Arizona
Hotel buildings completed in 1933
1933 establishments in Arizona
National Register of Historic Places in Gila County, Arizona